Brejana is a village in the municipality of Dzhebel, in Kardzhali Province, in southern-central Bulgaria. It covers an area of 2.035 square kilometres (0.786 sq mi) and as of 2007 it had a population of 20 people.

References

Villages in Kardzhali Province